This is a list of diplomatic missions in Bangladesh.  At present, the capital city of Dhaka hosts 51 resident embassies and high commissions, including the European Union delegation.

Other countries have accredited missions to Bangladesh by being resident in neighboring nations.

Honorary consulates and trade missions are omitted from this listing.

Diplomatic missions in Dhaka

Embassies and High Commissions 

 (Embassy)
 (Apostolic Nunciature)
 (High Commission)

 (Embassy)

 (Embassy)

 (High Commission)
 (Embassy)

Other missions or delegations
 (Delegation)

Gallery

Consular missions

Dhaka
 (Consulate)

Chittagong
 (Assistant High Commission)

Khulna
 (Assistant High Commission)

Rajshahi
 (Assistant High Commission)

Sylhet
 (Assistant High Commission)
 (Consular office)

Non-resident Embassies/High Commissions/Representative Offices
Resident in New Delhi, India:

Resident in Islamabad, Pakistan:

Resident in Beijing, China:

Resident elsewhere:

 (Bangkok)
 (Doha)
 (Abu Dhabi)
 (Tehran)
 (Taipei)
 (Taipei)
 (Abu Dhabi)
 (Muscat)
 (Taipei)
 (Abu Dhabi)
 (Taipei)
 (Jakarta)
 (Canberra)
 (Canberra)

Embassies to open

Former embassies
 (closed in 1990)

 (closed in 2005)
 (closed in 1992)

See also
 Foreign relations of Bangladesh
 List of diplomatic missions of Bangladesh

References

External links
 Ministry of Foreign Affairs of Bangladesh
 Foreign Missions in Dhaka
 Foreign Missions in Bangladesh
 Export Promotion Bureau- Honorary consulates in Bangladesh

Diplomatic missions in Bangladesh
Bangladesh
Missions